Andrey Kuznetsov won the title, defeating Farrukh Dustov 6–7(7–9), 6–2, 6–2 in the final.

Seeds

Draw

Finals

Top half

Bottom half

References
 Main Draw
 Qualifying Draw

Lermontov Cup - Singles
2012 Singles
2012 in Russian tennis